Mad Dog II: The Lost Gold is a live-action laserdisc video game produced by American Laser Games, released for the arcade, Sega CD, 3DO, CD-i and DOS, the first release being in 1992; the quality of the video is the lowest on Sega CD.  A sequel to the moderately popular Mad Dog McCree, the game abandoned the rather simple style of the original, introducing elements that can be considered "Hollywood", including dynamic shootout scenes and in-game music, as opposed to the original's almost complete lack thereof. Like the first game, the player follows the storyline and is required to quickly shoot certain enemies to proceed on the quest. The game was re-released by Digital Leisure in 2003 on DVD-Video and again in 2009 on the Wii as part of the Mad Dog McCree Gunslinger Pack, a compilation that also includes the first Mad Dog game as well as The Last Bounty Hunter.

Plot
The anonymous main character must track down the wanted outlaw himself, eliminating any and all gang members and hostiles along the way; from the introduction, one can conclude that he or she will be up against renegade Indians, banditos and "Mad Dog's sleazy crew".

The player proceeds through the game, first by taking a preparatory shooting lesson with a stagecoach driver – played by Ben Zeller, who appeared in the role of the prospector in the original game – and then by choosing one of three guides: Buckskin Bonnie, the Professor and Shooting Beaver. Each guide takes the player along a different, unique route, but they converge in the game's final shootouts, which take place inside a moving train and in Mad Dog's hideout; the latter scene is especially lengthy and culminates with a showdown with McCree himself.

However, hunting down and defeating the infamous gunfighter is not the player's only goal; Mad Dog has hidden a chest full of treasure in his hideout and it is up to the player to get it back from him. At times, the player will discover that the treasure chest is full of sand and obviously does not contain the "lost gold". However, this scene does not always occur unless the player has reached the end using more than one credit; furthermore, the sand scene does not appear on the CD-i or DVD versions of the game.

Gameplay
The player is guided along a path and must shoot the villains before they manage to hit the player character. A special cursor is used to specify the location the player is aiming at. There is also a limited number of bullets in the chamber; however, reloading can be done an infinite number of times.

Like Mad Dog McCree, The Last Bounty Hunter and Fast Draw Showdown, Mad Dog II contains random scenes in which the player takes part in a showdown against one or more gunfighters. The player starts out with an empty chamber and must quickly reload when given the chance, and proceed to eliminate the enemy as fast as possible. Shooting practice at the beginning of the game involves hitting cow skulls, signposts and such from a stagecoach in motion.

The player must avoid getting shot and hitting innocent civilians; if one of these occurs, the player loses one of three lives, and a short clip is displayed often showing an undertaker giving advice or criticizing the player's actions. In the CD-i, 3DO, and DOS versions, a mouse or light gun is used to shoot, reload and choose paths or guides; in addition, there is one load/save slot and three possible levels of difficulty.

Reception

The PC version of Mad Dog II received a 9% from the US version of PC Gamer magazine.

The 3DO version received a 6.2 out of 10 from Electronic Gaming Monthly; their reviewers commented the game was fun but lacked longevity. GamePro gave it a rave review, deeming it "a shot ahead of the original" and "a powerful Western shootout that helps justify the cost of a 3DO." They particularly praised the sharp graphics, the accuracy of the Gamegun peripheral, and the importance of paying attention to the sounds in order to succeed in the game. Next Generation reviewed the 3DO version of the game, rating it two stars out of five, and stated that "American Laser Games claims that Mad Dog II ends with the longest interactive battle ever filmed, but after having played through a tedious half an hour, you'll probably wonder whether or not this is a good thing."

GamePro gave the Sega CD version a more subdued but still positive review, saying it improved upon the graphics and sound quality of the original Mad Dog McCree. They also praised the choice of three different guides, which they said "adds greater depth and replay value to the game." Next Generation reviewed the Sega CD version of the game, rating it two stars out of five, and stated that "this is still the kind of stimulus-response, shooting-gallery action that defines gaming at its most basic level."

References

External links

1992 video games
3DO Interactive Multiplayer games
American Laser Games games
Arcade video games
CD-i games
Digital Leisure games
DOS games
Full motion video based games
Interactive movie video games
LaserDisc video games
Light gun games
Majesco Entertainment games
Menacer
PlayStation Network games
Sega CD games
Single-player video games
Video game sequels
Video games developed in the United States
Western (genre) video games
Wii games
Wii Zapper games